Lee Geung-young (born December 12, 1960) is a South Korean actor. He graduated from the Department of Drama in Seoul. He debuted in 1977 and after completing his mandatory military service, he debuted in 1982 as the 10th public relations actor for the Korea Broadcasting Corporation (KBS), became a voice actor for a year, and re-entered his KBS 18th career in 1983. In 1983, he debuted as an actor in the KBS drama "Ordinary People".  He also wrote and directed the films The Gate of Destiny (1996) and The Beauty in Dream (2002).

Filmography
*Note; the whole list is referenced.

Film

Television series

Web series

Music video appearances

Theater

Awards and nominations

Legal troubles
Lee was arrested immediately with the charge of prostitution with a minor aged 17 with the promise of starring the girl in a movie in 2002. Out of three intercourses, only two were found to be for the purpose of prostitution. Lee was found guilty and was ordered 160 hours of social service and 10 months of prison time with two years of probation.

References

External links

1960 births
Living people
People from Chungju
Hanyang University alumni
South Korean male film actors
South Korean male television actors
20th-century South Korean male actors
21st-century South Korean male actors
People convicted of child sexual abuse
Best Supporting Actor Paeksang Arts Award (film) winners